Stephen John Chomyszak (February 27, 1944 – January 25, 1988) was an American football defensive lineman in the American Football League (AFL) and the National Football League (NFL). A defensive tackle, he played for the AFL's New York Jets (1966–1967) and Cincinnati Bengals (1968–1973) of the AFL and NFL.

He attended Syracuse University and was drafted  in the 12th round (103rd overall) of the 1966 AFL Draft by the New York Jets, playing in two games that season and spending most of the season on the taxi squad. The following season, he saw no action due to a serious ankle injury.

He signed with the expansion Cincinnati Bengals for the 1968 season, playing in 10 games. He finally came into his own beginning in the 1969 season, playing all 14 games as a defensive end for the Bengals.

Switched to defensive tackle, Chomyszak became a starter in every now-NFL Bengals games of both the 1970 and 1971 seasons, and in 1972 starting 10 of his 13 games. In 1973, he played in 12 games, starting three.

On March 18, 1974, the fledgling World Football League (WFL) held its first "Pro Draft" of players from the NFL and Canadian Football League (CFL). The Philadelphia Bell chose the WFL rights to Chomyszak in the 11th round (123rd overall). On April 9, 1974, while still with the Bengals, Chomyszak signed a long-term contract that would take effect after the conclusion of the Bengals' season with the Philadelphia Bell. This incensed Bengals coach and general manager Paul Brown who, on July 31, 1974, traded Chomyszak to the Buffalo Bills. However, Chomyszak saw no action with the Bills and was cut by the team early in the season. He then played out the season in the soon-to-be-defunct WFL.

Chomyszak had broken his contract with the Bell and became a free agent in 1974. He received offers from several NFL teams but chose to return to the Bengals. But Brown waived him late in the preseason on August 26, 1975, leaving him without a team. He claimed that Brown had essentially blackballed him from the NFL.

During the 1975 season he was out of football, selling insurance.

In 1976, he signed with the expansion Tampa Bay Buccaneers, but was later waived.

Steve Chomyszak was married to Debra Jerene Nichols  While living in Florence, Kentucky (near Cincinnati) he was diagnosed with pancreatic cancer in 1987. He died on January 25, 1988, at his parents' home in Binghamton, New York.
 His son, Richard Chomyszak, is a chiropractor in Binghamton.

CORRECTIONS:
Steve divorced Debra and later married Pamela Long, on Jul 18 1980. They had 2 children together and he adopted Pam's son from a previous marriage. Their children are Bryan (adopted), Amy and Richard.

Resource: 
Kenton County, Kentucky Marriage Licenses.
Applicant 1 Stephen Chomyszak
Applicant 2 Pamela Long
Book 626 Page 313
Kenton Co. Clerk Homepage:
https://kentondeeds.com/menu.php
https://commons.wikimedia.org/wiki/File:Pam-Steve-MarriageRecord-KentonCO.KY.jpg

Please allow these corrections to stay on Steve's Wikipedia page. Not only to give the correct and full information, but to honor Steve and his life,,, not just part of it.
Thank you.

References

External links 

1944 births
1988 deaths
American football defensive tackles
Syracuse Orange football players
New York Jets players
Cincinnati Bengals players
Deaths from cancer in New York (state)
Deaths from pancreatic cancer
American Football League players